The Queens Community Board 5 is a local government in the New York City borough of Queens, encompassing the neighborhoods of Ridgewood, Glendale, Middle Village, Maspeth, Fresh Pond, and Liberty Park. It is delimited by Maurice Avenue and the Long Island Expressway to the north, the Brooklyn borough line to the west and south, and Woodhaven Boulevard to the east.

External links
Community Board 5 official website
Profile of the Community Board

References

Community boards of Queens